Tynewydd, Ceredigion (or Tŷ Newydd) is a hamlet in the  community of Y Ferwig, Ceredigion, Wales, which is 73.6 miles (118.5 km) from Cardiff and 194.6 miles (313.1 km) from London. Tynewydd is represented in the Senedd by Elin Jones (Plaid Cymru) and is part of the Ceredigion constituency in the House of Commons.

References

See also
List of localities in Wales by population 

Villages in Ceredigion